Hariola is a genus of planthoppers in the tribe Laternariini.  The two known species are both found in New Guinea.

Species
Two species are included in Fulgoromorpha Lists On the Web:
 Hariola claryi Audibert, Porion & Nagai, 2016
 Hariola tiarata Stål, 1863 – type species

References

External links 
 

Auchenorrhyncha genera
Hemiptera of Asia
Fulgorinae